Matthew Orford (born 22 April 1978), also known by the nickname of "The Ox", is an Australian former professional rugby league footballer who played in the 2000s and 2010s. He played for the Erina Eagles as a junior. A City New South Wales representative , he played the majority of his club football career in Australia for National Rugby League clubs Melbourne Storm and Manly-Warringah Sea Eagles, representing the latter when he won 2008's Dally M Medal and NRL premiership. Orford also played for NRL sides Northern Eagles and Canberra Raiders, as well as in Super League for England's Bradford Bulls.

Playing career
Orford was a North Sydney Bears junior and started his career with the Northern Eagles before joining the Melbourne Storm. In 2004, he was named the Storm's player of the year.

He joined the Manly-Warringah Sea Eagles for the 2006 NRL season. He was later appointed captain of the club. Orford was a member of the Manly-Warringah team which lost the 2007 NRL grand final to the Melbourne Storm. Orford captained the Manly-Warringah club in the 2008 NRL Grand Final victory over the Melbourne Storm.

In September 2008, Orford won the prestigious Dally M Medal for being voted the best and fairest player of the 2008 NRL season. He finished on 24 points, two points ahead of Billy Slater. Orford was the first player since Peter Sterling to win the Dally M Medal and the premiership in the same year.

He signed for the Bradford Bulls on a three-year deal, starting in the 2010 season. However, his first season with the struggling Yorkshire club did not go well and was brought to an early finish due to Orford suffering a shoulder injury that would require surgery. He gained a release from the Bradford club in order to return home to Australia.

Orford's release was officially granted on 10 January 2011, and he signed with the Canberra Raiders on the same day. Affected by a groin injury, Orford played six matches for Canberra in the 2011 NRL season. At the end of the season, he was released from the remainder of his contract.

Post retirement
In August 2016, Orford underwent emergency surgery to remove a blood clot from his brain.

In 2023 he was appointed as Manly's Under 16s Development Coach.

References

External links

Bradford Bulls profile
Matt Orford at NRL.com
Matt Orford at Manly Sea Eagles

1978 births
Living people
Australian rugby league players
Australian expatriate sportspeople in England
Bradford Bulls players
Canberra Raiders players
Manly Warringah Sea Eagles captains
Manly Warringah Sea Eagles players
Melbourne Storm players
New South Wales City Origin rugby league team players
Northern Eagles players
Prime Minister's XIII players
Rugby league halfbacks
Rugby league players from Gosford, New South Wales
Sportsmen from New South Wales